Parliamentary elections were held in Norway on 12 October 1953. The result was a victory for the Labour Party, which won 77 of the 150 seats in the Storting.

Results

Seat distribution

Notes

References

General elections in Norway
1950s elections in Norway
Norway
Parliamentary
Norway